Reedtown is an unincorporated community in Seneca County, in the U.S. state of Ohio.

History
A post office called Reedtown was established in 1828, and remained in operation until 1903. Like Reed Township, Reedtown derives its name from Seth Read, a pioneer settler.

References

Unincorporated communities in Seneca County, Ohio
Unincorporated communities in Ohio